Allotinus substrigosus is a butterfly in the family Lycaenidae. It was described by Frederic Moore in 1884. It is found in Asia.

Subspecies
Allotinus substrigosus substrigosus (Sumatra)
Allotinus substrigosus ballantinei Eliot, 1986 (Philippines: Palawan)
Allotinus substrigosus lenaia Fruhstorfer, 1913 (Nias)
Allotinus substrigosus sibyllinus Riley, 1944 (Mentawai)
Allotinus substrigosus yusukei Eliot, 1986 (Philippines: Mindanao)

References

Butterflies described in 1884
Allotinus
Butterflies of Asia
Taxa named by Frederic Moore